Events in the year 1886 in Spain.

Incumbents
Monarch: Alfonso XIII from May 17
Prime Minister: Práxedes Mateo Sagasta

Events
April 4 - Spanish general election, 1886

Births
May 17 - Alfonso XIII

Deaths

References

 
1880s in Spain